Brett Mydske (born July 30, 1988, in New Westminster, British Columbia) is a lacrosse player for the Saskatchewan Rush in the National Lacrosse League. Mydske was drafted in the third round (25th overall) in the 2009 NLL Entry Draft by the Rush.

Statistics

NLL

References

1988 births
Living people
Canadian lacrosse players
Edmonton Rush players
Saskatchewan Rush players
Sportspeople from New Westminster